is a Japanese former volleyball player who competed in the 1968 Summer Olympics, in the 1972 Summer Olympics, and in the 1976 Summer Olympics. He was born in Fukushima Prefecture.

In 1968, he was part of the Japanese team which won the silver medal in the Olympic tournament. He played two matches. Four years later, in 1972,  he won the gold medal with the Japanese team in the 1972 Olympic tournament. He played one match. At the 1976 Games, he was a member of the Japanese team which finished fourth in the Olympic tournament. He played all five matches.

References
 Tetsuo Satō's profile at Sports Reference.com

1949 births
Living people
Japanese men's volleyball players
Olympic volleyball players of Japan
Volleyball players at the 1968 Summer Olympics
Volleyball players at the 1972 Summer Olympics
Volleyball players at the 1976 Summer Olympics
Olympic gold medalists for Japan
Olympic silver medalists for Japan
Olympic medalists in volleyball
Asian Games medalists in volleyball
Volleyball players at the 1970 Asian Games
Volleyball players at the 1974 Asian Games
Medalists at the 1970 Asian Games
Medalists at the 1974 Asian Games
Asian Games gold medalists for Japan
Medalists at the 1972 Summer Olympics
Medalists at the 1968 Summer Olympics
20th-century Japanese people